A datum reference or just datum (plural: datums) is some important part of an object—such as a point, line, plane, hole, set of holes, or pair of surfaces—that serves as a reference in defining the geometry of the object and (often) in measuring aspects of the actual geometry to assess how closely they match with the nominal value, which may be an ideal, standard, average, or desired value. For example, on a car's wheel, the lug nut holes define a bolt circle that is a datum from which the location of the rim can be defined and measured. This matters because the hub and rim need to be concentric to within close limits (or else the wheel will not roll smoothly). The concept of datums is used in many fields, including carpentry, metalworking, needlework, geometric dimensioning and tolerancing (GD&T), aviation, surveying, geodesy (geodetic datums), and others.

Uses
In carpentry, an alternative, more common name is "face side" and "face edge". The artisan nominates two straight edges on a workpiece  as the "datum edges", and they are marked accordingly. One convention is to mark the first datum edge with a single slanted line (/) and the second  with double lines (//). For most work, the datum references of the workpiece need to be square. If necessary they may be cut, planed or filed to make them so. In subsequent marking out, all measurements are then taken from either of the two datum references.

In aviation, an aircraft is designed to operate within a specified range of weight and (chiefly longitudinal) balance; an airman is responsible for determining these factors for each flight under his or her command.  This requires the calculation of moment for each variable mass in the aircraft (fuel, passengers, cargo, etc.), by multiplying its weight by its distance from a datum reference.  The datum for light airplanes is usually the engine firewall or the tip of the spinner, but in all cases it is a fixed plane perpendicular to the aircraft's longitudinal axis, and specified in its operating handbook.

Engineering 

An engineering datum used in geometric dimensioning and tolerancing is a feature on an object used to create a reference system for measurement.
In engineering and drafting, a datum is a reference point, surface, or axis on an object against which measurements are made.

These are then referred to by one or more 'datum references' which indicate measurements that should be made with respect to the corresponding datum feature .

In geometric dimensioning and tolerancing, datum reference frames are typically 3D.  Datum reference frames are used as part of the feature control frame to show where the measurement is taken from.  A typical datum reference frame is made up of three planes.  For example, the three planes could be one "face side" and two "datum edges". These three planes are marked A, B and C, where A is the face side, B is the first datum edge, and C is the second datum edge. In this case, the datum reference frame is A/B/C. A/B/C is shown at the end of feature control frame to show from where the measurement is taken. (See the ASME standard Y14.5M-2009 for more examples and material modifiers.)

The engineer selects A/B/C based on the dimensional function of the part. The datums should be functional per the ASME standard. Typically, a part is required to fit with other parts. So, the functional datums are chosen based on how the part attaches. Note: Typically, the functional datums are not used to manufacture the part. The manufacturing datums are typically different from the functional datums to save cost, improve process speed, and repeatability. A tolerance analysis may be needed in many cases to convert between the functional datums and the manufacturing datums. Computer software can be purchased for dimensional analysis. A trained engineer is required to run the software.

There are typically 6 degrees of freedom that need to be considered by the engineer before choosing which feature is A, B, or C. For this example, A is the primary datum, B is the secondary, and C is the tertiary datum. The primary datum controls the most degrees of freedom. The tertiary datum controls the least degrees of freedom.  For this example, of a block of wood, Datum A controls 3 degrees of freedom, B controls 2 degrees of freedom, and C controls 1 degree of freedom. 3+2+1 = 6, all 6 degrees of freedom are considered.

The 6 degrees of freedom in this example are 3 translation and 3 rotation about the 3D coordinate system. Datum A controls 3: translation along the Z axis, rotation about the x axis, and rotation about the y axis. Datum B controls 2: translation along the y axis and rotation about the z axis.  Finally, Datum C controls 1 degree of freedom, namely the translation along the x axis.

See also 
 Datum (geodesy)
 Exact constraint
 Reference frame
 Surface plate
 Spatial reference system

Notes

References

Woodworking
Geometry
Coordinate systems